The following list includes notable people who were born or have lived in Concord, New Hampshire.

Artists, authors, and entertainers 

 John Adams (born 1947), Pulitzer Prize-winning composer
 Emma Elizabeth Brown (born 1847–?), artist, writer
 Carson Cistulli (born 1979), poet, essayist, baseball analyst
JooYoung Choi (born 1982), artist
 George Condo (born 1957), artist
 Tony Conrad (1940–2016), experimental filmmaker, musician, composer
 Annie Duke (born 1965), professional poker player
 Dan Habib, photojournalist, documentary filmmaker
 Richard Lederer (born 1938), author, commentator on the English language
Frederick Ferdinand Moore (1881–1947), novelist, soldier, recipient of Japanese Order of the Rising Sun
 Tad Mosel (1922–2008), Pulitzer Prize-winning playwright
 Tom Rush (born 1941), folk and blues singer and songwriter
 Mary Parker Woodworth (1849–1919), writer, speaker

Business and organizations 

 Gary Hirshberg (born 1954), CEO of Stonyfield Farm
 Benjamin Holt (1849–1920), inventor; founder of Holt Manufacturing Company
 Levi Hutchins (1761–1855), clockmaker, inventor in 1787 of the first American alarm clock
 Sylvester Marsh (1803–1884), builder of the Mount Washington Cog Railway
 Fanny E. Minot (1847–1919), national president Woman's Relief Corps
 Sarah Thompson, Countess Rumford (1774–1852), philanthropist, founder of Rolfe and Rumford Asylum and daughter of Benjamin Thompson (loyalist to Britain during the American Revolutionary War)

Military 
 Onslow S. Rolfe (1895–1985), U.S. Army brigadier general

Politics 

 Joseph Carter Abbott (1825–1881), Union Army general in the Civil War, U.S. senator from North Carolina
 Styles Bridges (1898–1961), U.S. senator, 63rd governor of New Hampshire
 Frank O. Briggs (1851–1913), U.S. Senator from New Jersey, New Jersey State Senator, Mayor of Trenton, New Jersey, born in Concord
 Henry G. Burleigh (1832–1900), U.S. congressman
 Benjamin F. Carter (1824–1916), Wisconsin legislator
 William E. Chandler (1835–1917), U.S. senator, U.S. Secretary of the Navy
 Ezra Durgin (1796–1863), Wisconsin legislator
 John R. French (1819–1890), U.S. congressman
 Elizabeth Gurley Flynn (1890–1964), labor leader, activist
 Joseph A. Gilmore (1811–1867), railroad superintendent, 29th governor of New Hampshire
 Isaac Hill (1788–1851), U.S. senator, 16th governor of New Hampshire
 Paul Hodes (born 1951), U.S. congressman
 Arthur Livermore (1766–1853), U.S. congressman
 Mace Moulton (1796–1867), U.S. congressman
 Franklin Pierce (1804–1869), 14th president of the United States
 David Souter (born 1939), retired Associate Justice of the Supreme Court of the United States
 Thomas Stickney (1729–1809), soldier in the American Revolution, statesman
 George P. Tebbetts (1828–1909), third mayor of San Diego (1852)
 Robert W. Upton (1884–1972), U.S. senator

Religious workers 

 Mary Baker Eddy (1821–1910), founder of the Church of Christ, Scientist
 Ruth A. Parmelee (1885–1973), Christian missionary, witness to the Armenian genocide
 Armenia S. White (1817–1916) suffragette, philanthropist, social reformer

Scientists and academics 

 Judy Fortin (born 1961), medical correspondent for CNN
 Christa McAuliffe (1948–1986), teacher, first Teacher in Space project winner, died in the Space Shuttle Challenger disaster
 Sir Benjamin Thompson, Count Rumford (1753–1814), scientist, inventor, loyalist during the American Revolution War

Sports 

 Gavin Bayreuther (born 1994), defensemen for the Columbus Blue Jackets
 Matt Bonner (born 1980), power forward and center for the Toronto Raptors and San Antonio Spurs
 Joe Lefebvre (born 1956), right fielder for the New York Yankees, San Diego Padres, and Philadelphia Phillies
 Ben Lovejoy (born 1984), former NHL defensemen
 Tara Mounsey (born 1978), hockey defenseman, played for the U.S. Women's Olympic Hockey Team
 Red Rolfe (1908–1969), New York Yankees starting player, five-time World Series winner
 Brian Sabean (born 1956), general manager of the San Francisco Giants
 Bob Tewksbury (born 1960), pitcher for six Major League Baseball teams

References 

Concord, New Hampshire
Concord